This is a list of  government ministries in Lagos State, Nigeria. Each ministry is coordinated by the Commissioner, assisted by a Permanent Secretary.

List of ministries and their commissioners.

See also
Lagos State
Lagos State Executive Council

References

 
Lagos-related lists
Lagos State